Jacques Speck (5 November 1931 – 3 October 1971) was a Luxembourgian footballer. He played in two matches for the Luxembourg national football team in 1953. He was also part of Luxembourg's team for the 1952 Summer Olympics, and for their qualification matches for the 1954 FIFA World Cup.

References

External links
 

1931 births
1971 deaths
Luxembourgian footballers
Luxembourg international footballers
Place of birth missing
Association football defenders